The True Story of the Civil War is a 1956 American short documentary film directed by Louis Clyde Stoumen. In 1957, it won an Oscar for Documentary Short Subject at the 29th Academy Awards. The Academy Film Archive preserved The True Story of the Civil War in 2005.

See also
List of American films of 1956

References

External links

1956 films
1956 short films
1956 documentary films
American short documentary films
American black-and-white films
1950s short documentary films
Best Documentary Short Subject Academy Award winners
Films directed by Louis Clyde Stoumen
Documentary films about the American Civil War
1950s English-language films
1950s American films